The Braj language, Braj Bhasha, also known as Vraj Bhasha or Vrij Bhasha or Braj Bhāṣā or Braji or Brij Bhasha or Braj Boli, is a Western Hindi language. Along with Awadhi (a variety of Eastern Hindi), it was one of the two predominant literary languages of North-Central India before the switch to Hindustani in the 19th century.

Braj is spoken by people in the vaguely defined region of Braj (Braj Bhumi) in northern India, which was a political state in the era of the Mahabharata wars.  According to ancient Hindu texts such as the Bhagavata Purana, the Kingdom of Surasena is described as spreading through Braj (also known as Brij, Vrija or Vraja), where the incarnation of Vishnu, Krishna was born and spent his childhood days, according to tradition. This region lies in the Agra-Mathura-Hathras-Firozabad-Aligarh area and Etawah-Mainpuri-Auraiya area, and stretches as far as the environs of Delhi. In modern India, this area lies mostly in central western Uttar Pradesh, the eastern extremities of Rajasthan i.e. Bharatpur, Karauli and Dholpur and the southern extremities of Haryana. Northern regions of Madhya Pradesh like Morena are also included. Today Braj Bhumi can be seen as a cultural-geographical entity rather than a proper state. Braj Bhasha is the vernacular of the region, and is very close to Awadhi, spoken in the neighbouring Awadh region.

Much of the Hindi literature was developed in Braj in the medieval period, and a substantial amount of Bhakti or devotional poetry is in this language. Some devotional poems for Krishna are also composed in Braj. Braj is also the main language of Hindustani classical music compositions.

The Hindavi poet Amir Khusrau (1253–1325) wrote some of his poetry in Braj Bhasha, as did the Sikh scribe Bhai Gurdas (1551–1636). Braj folk songs and poems include Chhaap Tilak Sab Chheeni by Amir Khusrau, and the devotional song Main Naahin Maakhan Khaayo by Surdas.

Geographical distribution 

Braj Bhasha is spoken in the nebulous Braj region centred on Mathura and Agra in Uttar Pradesh and Bharatpur and Dholpur in Rajasthan. It is the predominant language in the central stretch of the Ganges-Yamuna Doab in the following districts:
 Hathras
 Mathura
 Agra
 Aligarh
 Firozabad
 Auraiya
 Etah
 Mainpuri
 Etawah
 Farrukhabad 
 Kasganj
 Badaun
 Palwal

 Bharatpur
 Karauli

It is also spoken in the western areas of Uttar Pradesh, mainly in Mathura district and southern areas of Faridabad district

In Madhya Pradesh it is spoken in the districts of :
 Bhind
 Morena, 
 Gwalior
 Shivpuri.

It is spoken in several villages of Mathura, specially in Vrindavan, Madhuvan, Kaman, Kosi Kalan, Chhata, Baldeo, and all other villages belongs to Braj Area with Bajna, Surir, Bhidauni,

Literature 

Most Braj literature is of a mystical nature, related to the spiritual union of people with God, because almost all of the Braj Bhasha poets were considered God-realised saints and their words are thus considered as directly emanating from a divine source. Much of the traditional Northern Indian literature shares this trait. All traditional Punjabi literature is similarly written by saints and is of a metaphysical and philosophical nature.

Another peculiar feature of Northern Indian literature is that the literature is mostly written from a female point of view, even by male poets. This is because the saints were in a state of transcendental, spiritual love, where they were metaphorically women reuniting with their beloved. (In its inversion of the conventional genders of worshipper and worshippee, Maulana Da’ud's Chandayan departs from this tradition.)

Important works in Braj Bhasha are:
 “ pushtimargiya kiratan of ashtachhap.
 Yugala Shataka by Swami Sri Sribhatta Devacarya; known as the first 'Vani' book in Vraja Bhasha composed in the 14th century AD as a part of Nimbarka Sampradaya tradition of Radha Krishna worship.
 Vinaya Patrika by Tulsidas
 Sur Sagar by Surdas
 Buddha Charit by Acharya Ram Chandra Shukla
 Sufi poetry by Amir Khusro
 Eulogies by Kavi Bhushan
 Nayikabhed, Nakhshikh and satasattak by Chhatrapati Sambhaji Maharaj.
 Vrind Satsai by Vrind (1643–1723), court poet of ruler of Kishangarh
 Dasam Granth, a secondary Sikh scripture predominantly employing the Braj-language, whose authorship is attributed to Guru Gobind Singh, the tenth Sikh Guru

Braj Bhasha sample sentences

See also 
 Hindi literature
 Brajavali dialect
 Brajabuli
 Awadhi language

References

Further reading 
 Snell, Rupert. 1991. The Hindi Classical Tradition: A Braj Bhāṣā Reader 
 Snell, Rupert. 2016. Braj in Brief: An introduction to literary Braj Bhāṣā

External links 
 https://web.archive.org/web/20070524104936/http://www.ciil.org/Main/Languages/indian.htm

Languages of India
Hindi languages
Languages of Uttar Pradesh
Languages of Rajasthan
Brij